Carlo Mercati (born 19 May 1976) is a former Italian male canoeist who was World champion at 2004 Garmisch-Partenkirchen.

References

External links
 Carlo Mercati at White Water Racing Team

1976 births
Living people
Canoeists of Marina Militare
Canoeists of Gruppo Sportivo Forestale
Italian male canoeists
21st-century Italian people